Alpha-(1,3)-fucosyltransferase is an enzyme that in humans is encoded by the FUT9 gene.

FUT9 is one of several alpha-3-fucosyltransferases that can catalyze the last step in the biosynthesis of Lewis antigen, the addition of a fucose to precursor polysaccharides. FUT9 synthesizes the LeX oligosaccharide (CD15), which is expressed in organ buds progressing in mesenchyma during human embryogenesis.[supplied by OMIM]

References

Further reading